The following highways are numbered 928:

Costa Rica
 National Route 928

United States